The 1966 Omloop Het Volk was the 21st edition of the Omloop Het Volk cycle race and was held on 5 March 1966. The race started and finished in Ghent. The race was won by Jo de Roo.

General classification

References

1966
Omloop Het Nieuwsblad
Omloop Het Nieuwsblad